Ovalipes ocellatus, known as the lady crab, is a species of crab from eastern North America. Other names for it include the leopard crab or Atlantic leopard crab due to the leopard-like rosette patterns on its shell, the calico crab (not to be confused with Hepatus epheliticus), or ocellated crab. It occurs from Canada to Georgia, and lives mainly on molluscs, such as the Atlantic surf clam.

Taxonomy
O. ocellatus was first described by Johann Friedrich Wilhelm Herbst in 1799, as Cancer ocellatus. In 1898, Mary Jane Rathbun moved the species to her new genus Ovalipes.

Description
This distinguishes it from other crabs in the family Portunidae, which often have elongated lateral spines. The carapace is yellow-grey or light purplish, with "leopardlike clusters of purple dots", and 3–5 spines along the edge behind each eye. O. ovalipes is almost identical to O. floridanus, which lives in the Gulf of Mexico, but can be separated from the sympatric O. stephensoni by the purple spots, which O. stephensoni lacks.

Distribution
The distribution of O. ocellatus extends from Canada to Georgia. O. ocellatus is "probably the only Ovalipes species common north of Virginia", being replaced by Ovalipes stephensoni to the south.

Life cycle

Ecology
O. ocellatus is a nocturnal predator, which often buries itself in the sand. It has been described as "vicious" and "the crab most likely to pinch a wader's toes". It feeds mostly on molluscs, particularly the Atlantic surf clam Spisula solidissima.

References

Portunoidea
Crustaceans of the Atlantic Ocean
Crustaceans described in 1799